Egypt was a major battlefield in the North African campaign during the Second World War, being the location of the First and Second Battles of El Alamein. Legally an independent kingdom, and an equal sovereign power in the condominium of Anglo-Egyptian Sudan, in reality Egypt was heavily under the coercive influence of the United Kingdom, a state of affairs that had persisted since the United Kingdom intervened militarily in the Urabi Revolt in favour of Egypt's Khedive, Tewfik Pasha, in 1882, subsequently occupying the country.

The continuing British dominance of Egyptian affairs, including British efforts to exclude Egypt from the governance of Sudan, provoked fierce Egyptian nationalist opposition to the United Kingdom. Consequently, despite playing host to thousands of British troops following the outbreak of the conflict, as it was treaty-bound to do, Egypt remained formally neutral during the war, only declaring war on the Axis powers in the spring of 1945. Though escaping the fate of Iraq, and Iran, both of whose governments were toppled by the United Kingdom during the war (the latter in conjunction with the Soviet Union), Egypt experienced the Abdeen Palace Incident, a confrontation between Egypt's King Farouk and the British military in 1942, the results of which would contribute directly to the Egyptian Revolution of 1952 a decade later.

Background

History of British influence 

For most of the 19th century, though nominally a self-governing vassal state of the Ottoman Empire, Egypt under the Muhammad Ali dynasty was a virtually independent state, with ever-increasing territorial possessions in East Africa, chiefly Sudan. Though Egypt embraced French cultural influence throughout the reign of the Muhammad Ali dynasty, with the French language becoming second only to Arabic as a lingua franca in Egypt, it was ultimately the United Kingdom that would become the dominant foreign power in Egypt and Sudan. In 1875, facing an economic emergency caused in large measure by his grand modernisation plans, Egypt's Khedive, Isma'il the Magnificent, sold to the British government Egypt's shares in the Universal Company of the Maritime Canal of Suez, the company established by Egypt to hold the 99-year lease to manage the Suez Canal. Seen by the United Kingdom as a vital connection to its maritime empire, particularly in India, British control of the Canal was the foundation for British control over Egypt as a whole. Four years later in 1879, the United Kingdom along with the other Great Powers deposed and exiled Isma'il, replacing him with his pliant son Tewfik.

Tewfik was seen by nationalist Egyptians as a puppet of the foreign powers who had installed him on the khedival throne, and his repressive policies, including reversing the progressive reforms of his father, immediately alienated him from Egyptians, especially in the Egyptian military. In 1881, a nationalist revolt led by Ahmed Orabi erupted against Tewfik. Orabi denounced the Khedive, and the perceived injustices of the economic conditions that had been imposed upon Egypt by the Great Powers following the removal of Isma'il.

Viewing Orabi and the revolutionaries as a potential threat to British control of the Suez Canal, the United Kingdom acceded to Tewfik's call for aid, and a British expeditionary force was dispatched to Egypt in 1882, successfully crushing the revolt, and exiling Orabi. The United Kingdom declared its commitment to withdrawing its forces once the authority of the Khedive had been restored, however, in reality Egypt was now under de facto British control. From 1882 until the outbreak of the First World War in 1914, Egypt's legal status as a self-governing vassal state of the Ottoman Empire continued unchanged, yet in reality it was administered as what became known as a veiled protectorate of the United Kingdom. Upon the Ottoman Empire's entry into the First World War on the side of the Central Powers, the legal fiction of Ottoman sovereignty over Egypt was terminated, and the Sultanate of Egypt that had been destroyed by the Ottomans in 1517 was re-established. This nominal change in status was, however, little more than symbolic, as the United Kingdom declared Egypt to be a protectorate rather than an independent state, with British control of the country continuing unchanged.

Eight years later in 1922, following the Egyptian Revolution of 1919, and increasing nationalist Egyptian pressure, the United Kingdom formally recognised Egypt as an independent state. However, the legal instrument by which this recognition was made by the United Kingdom was purposefully issued unilaterally without the consent of the Egyptian government so as to enable the United Kingdom to reserve for itself specific powers in Egypt regarding foreign policy, the deployment of British military personnel, and the administration of Sudan. This provided the United Kingdom with the basis to continue to dominate Egypt and Sudan politically and economically, and fostered increased Egyptian nationalist opposition in the lead up to the Second World War.

King Farouk of Egypt 

The teenage Farouk acceded to the throne of Egypt and Sudan upon the death of his father, King Fuad I, in 1936. Achieving his majority shortly before the outbreak of the Second World War, King Farouk was keen for Egypt to remain neutral in the conflict. Though having been partially educated in the United Kingdom, Farouk's sympathies lay with the Egyptian nationalists who opposed the United Kingdom's continued dominance of Egyptian and Sudanese affairs. Moreover, once the war began, the terms of the Anglo-Egyptian Treaty of 1936, signed when Farouk had just become King and was still in his minority, compelled Egypt to permit the United Kingdom to station its troops on Egyptian territory. The return of British soldiers to Egyptian streets merely a handful of years after they had been removed or relocated to the Suez Canal Zone, increased the already powerful opposition in Egypt to the United Kingdom. Another focus of grievance between the King and the United Kingdom was the British insistence that Farouk expel or intern Italians in Egypt, including those Italians in the service of the King. An unconfirmed story assets that Farouk told the United Kingdom's Ambassador, Sir Miles Lampson: "I'll get rid of my Italians when you get rid of yours". This remark was a reference to the ambassador's Italian wife.

By February 1942, following successful German involvement in the North African campaign, there was increasing British fear about British ability to secure the Suez Canal from German attack. The United Kingdom was keen for King Farouk to appoint a Prime Minister sympathetic to the British position. Farouk, however, refused to concede to British pressure, and insisted that the issue of the appointment of Egypt's Prime Minister was a matter of national sovereignty. The stand off resulted in the Abdeen Palace Incident. On the night of 4 February 1942, British soldiers and tanks surrounded King Farouk's palace in Alexandria to compel the King to dismiss Prime Minister Hussein Sirri Pasha in favour of Mostafa El-Nahas, whom the United Kingdom government felt would be more sympathetetic to their war effort against the Axis. The British Ambassador, Miles Lampson, marched into the palace, and threatened the King with the bombardment of his palace, his removal as King, and his exile from Egypt unless he conceded to the British demands. Mohamed Naguib, a distinguished military officer and one of the future leaders of the Egyptian Revolution of 1952, appealed to Farouk to resist the British, and pledged loyal officers to defend the palace. Ultimately, however, facing the certainty of defeat, the 22 year old King capitulated, and appointed Nahas.

The incident was seen as a personal humiliation for Farouk, and a national humiliation for Egypt. Gamal Abdel Nasser, then a young military officer who would later lead the Revolution of 1952 with Mohamed Naguib, declared the incident a blatant violation of Egyptian sovereignty, and wrote: "I am ashamed that our army has not reacted against this attack", and wished for "calamity" to overtake the British.

Italian invasion 

The Italian invasion of Egypt  began as a limited tactical operation towards Mersa Matruh, rather than for the strategic objectives sketched in Rome, due to the chronic lack of transport, fuel and wireless equipment, even with transfers from the 5th Army. Musaid was subjected to a "spectacular" artillery bombardment at dawn and occupied. The British withdrew past Buq Buq on 14 September but continued to harass the Italian advance. The British continued to fall back, going to Alam Hamid on the 15th and Alam el Dab on the 16th. An Italian force of fifty tanks attempted a flanking move, which led the British rearguard to retire east of Sidi Barrani. Graziani halted the advance.

The British anticipated that the Italian advance would stop at Sidi Barrani and Sofafi and began to observe the positions. British naval and air operations continued to harass the Italian army as the 7th Armoured Division prepared to confront an advance on Matruh.

Italian defeat 

Selby Force guarded the eastern approaches to Sidi Barrani, as the rest of the WDF attacked the fortified camps further inland. On 10 December, the 4th Armoured Brigade, which had been screening the attackers from a possible Italian counter-attack from the west, advanced northwards, cut the coast road between Sidi Barrani and Buq Buq, and sent armoured car patrols westwards. The 7th Armoured Brigade remained in reserve, and the 7th Support Group blocked an approach from Rabia and Sofafi to the south.

The fighting continued for many hours, without substantial gains, until  when the Blackshirts holding two strongholds on the western side suddenly surrendered. The brigade continued advancing with the last of the Infantry tanks, an extra infantry battalion, and support from the 2nd Royal Tank Regiment.

The second attack began just after . Italian artillery opened fire on the infantry as they were dismounting. The last ten Matildas drove into the western face of the Sidi Barrani defences, and although they were met by Italian artillery, it was ineffective. At 6 p.m., approximately  surrendered. The British continued advancing until they reached Mersa Brega by February, 1941.

German intervention 

Adolf Hitler sent his army to North Africa starting in February 1941 (see Operation Sonnenblume). Nazi Germany's General Erwin Rommel's Deutsches Afrikakorps coming from victories at Tobruk in Libya, and in a classic blitzkrieg, comprehensively outfought British forces. Within weeks the British had been pushed back into Egypt.

German defeat
Rommel's offensive was eventually stopped at the small railway halt of El Alamein, 150 miles from Cairo. In July 1942 Rommel lost the First Battle of El Alamein, largely due to the problem of an extended supply line which troubled both sides throughout the war in North Africa. The British were now very close to their supplies and had fresh troops on hand. In early September 1942 Rommel tried again to break through the British lines during the Battle of Alam el Halfa. He was decisively stopped by the newly arrived British commander, Lieutenant General Bernard Montgomery.

With British forces from Malta interdicting his supplies at sea, and the massive distances they had to cover in the desert, Rommel could not hold the El Alamein position forever. Still, it took a large set piece battle from late October to early November 1942, the Second Battle of El Alamein, to defeat the Germans forcing them to retreat westwards towards Libya and Tunisia.

Egyptian participation
Although Egypt was part of the British Military Operations zone and British forces were stationed there, many Egyptian Army units also fought alongside them. Some units like 9th, 10th, 11th and 12th Infantry Regiments, 16th and 12th Cavalry Regiments, 17th Horse Artillery Regiment, and 22nd King's Own Artillery Regiment. Some other units also fought but its names are unknown. Beside these units, the Anti-Aircraft Artillery Regiments all over Egypt played a vital role in destroying Luftwaffe attacks on Alexandria, Cairo, Suez, and Northern Delta.

Allied victory 

The leadership of the United Kingdom's General Bernard Montgomery at the Second Battle of El Alamein, or the Battle of Alamein, marked a significant turning point of World War II and was the first major victory by British Commonwealth forces over the German Army. The battle lasted from 23 October to 3 November 1942. Following the First Battle of El Alamein, which had stalled the Axis advance, British general Bernard Montgomery took command of the Eighth Army from Claude Auchinleck in August 1942. Success in the battle turned the tide in the North African Campaign. Some historians believe that the battle, along with the Battle of Stalingrad, were the two major Allied victories that contributed to the eventual defeat of Nazi Germany.

By July 1942, the German Afrika Korps under General Rommel had struck deep into Egypt, threatening the vital Allied supply line across the Suez Canal. Faced with overextended supply lines and lack of reinforcements and yet well aware of massive Allied reinforcements arriving, Rommel decided to strike at the Allies while their build-up was still not complete. This attack on 30 August 1942 at Alam Halfa failed, and expecting a counterattack by Montgomery's Eighth Army, the Afrika Korps dug in. After six more weeks of building up forces, the Eighth Army was ready to strike. 200,000 men and 1,000 tanks under Montgomery made their move against the 100,000 men and 500 tanks of the Afrika Korps.

The Allied plan 
With Operation Lightfoot, Montgomery hoped to cut two corridors through the Axis minefields in the north. Armour would then pass through and defeat the German armour. Diversionary attacks in the south would keep the rest of the Axis forces from moving northwards. Montgomery expected a twelve-day battle in three stages — "The break-in, the dog-fight and the final break of the enemy."

The Commonwealth forces practised a number of deceptions in the months prior to the battle to wrong-foot the Axis command, not only as to the exact whereabouts of the forthcoming battle, but as to when the battle was likely to occur. This operation was codenamed, Operation Bertram. A dummy pipeline was built, stage by stage, the construction of which would lead the Axis to believe the attack would occur much later than it in fact did, and much further south. To further the illusion, dummy tanks made of plywood frames placed over jeeps were constructed and deployed in the south. In a reverse feint, the tanks for battle in the north were disguised as supply lorries by placing a removable plywood superstructure over them.

The Axis were dug-in along two lines, called by the Allies the Oxalic Line and the Pierson Line. They had laid around half a million mines, mainly anti-tank, in what was called the Devil's gardens.

The battle 

The battle opened at 2140 hours on 23 October with a sustained artillery barrage. The initial objective was the Oxalic Line with the armour intending to advance over this and on to the Pierson Line. However, the minefields were not yet fully cleared when the assault began.

On the first night, the assault to create the northern corridor fell three miles short of the Pierson line. Further south, they had made better progress but were stalled at Miteirya Ridge.

On 24 October, the Axis commander, General Stumme (Rommel was on sick leave in Austria), died of a heart attack while under fire. After a period of confusion, while Stumme's body was missing, General Ritter von Thoma took command of the Axis forces. Hitler initially instructed Rommel to remain at home and continue his convalescence but then became alarmed at the deteriorating situation and asked Rommel to return to Africa if he felt able. Rommel left at once and arrived on 25 October.

For the Allies in the south, after another abortive assault on the Miteirya Ridge, the attack was abandoned. Montgomery switched the focus of the attack to the north. There was a successful night attack over the 25-26th. Rommel's immediate counter-attack was without success. The Allies had lost 6,200 men against Axis losses of 2,500, but while Rommel had only 370 tanks fit for action, Montgomery still had over 900.

Montgomery felt that the offensive was losing momentum and decided to regroup. There were a number of small actions but, by 29 October, the Axis line was still intact. Montgomery was still confident and prepared his forces for Operation Supercharge. The endless small operations and the attrition by the Allied airforce had by then reduced Rommel's effective tank strength to only 102.

The second major Allied offensive of the battle was along the coast, initially to capture the Rahman Track and then take the high ground at Tel el Aqqaqir. The attack began on 2 November 1942. By the 3rd, Rommel had only 35 tanks fit for action. Despite containing the Allied advance, the pressure on his forces made a retreat necessary. However, the same day Rommel received a "victory or death" message from Hitler, halting the withdrawal. But the Allied pressure was too great, and the German forces had to withdraw on the night of 3–4 November. By 6 November, the Axis forces were in full retreat and over 30,000 soldiers had surrendered.

Aftermath

Churchill's summation 
Winston Churchill famously summed up the battle on 10 November 1942 with the words, "now this is not the end, it is not even the beginning of the end. But it is, perhaps, the end of the beginning."

The battle was Montgomery's greatest triumph. He took the title "Viscount Montgomery of Alamein" when he was raised to the peerage.

The Torch landings in Morocco later that month marked the effective end of the Axis threat in North Africa.

Egyptian fleet damages 

In total, 14 Egyptian ships were sunk during the war by U-boats, those included: one ship sunk by German submarine U-83, three ships sunk, and one survived with damage by German submarine U-77, nine ships sunk by German submarine U-81.

See also 
Military history of the British Commonwealth in the Second World War
Egypt in the Middle Ages

References

Sources 

Alamein by C E Lucas Phillips

External links 

Text of Cairo Declaration

 
World War II
World War II
Egypt
Politics of World War II
20th century in Egypt
Articles containing video clips
 
1930s in Egypt
1940s in Egypt